Bunch is an unincorporated community in southwestern Adair County, Oklahoma, United States.  It was named after a Cherokee vice-chief named Rabbit Bunch who lived in the area in the 1880s.  Nestled in the Sallisaw Creek valley, Bunch is bisected by the Kansas City Southern Railroad, which was built in the 1890s.  Bunch is in the Cookson Hills area of eastern Oklahoma which are a part of the western area of the Ozark Mountains.  The Cookson Hills Wildlife Management Area is west of the town.  The post office's zip code is 74931.  Two and one-half miles north of town is Cave Springs Public Schools, a K-12 school which serves Bunch and the surrounding area.

Demographics

Popular culture
Bunch is one of the prominent locales referenced in Elmore Leonard's crime  novel "The Hot Kid", which takes place in the 1930s.

References

Unincorporated communities in Adair County, Oklahoma
Unincorporated communities in Oklahoma